Sir Terry may refer to:
Terry Farrell (architect) (born 1938), British architect and urban designer
Terry Farrell (cricketer) (born 1939), English cricketer
Terry Frost (1915–2003), English artist
Terry Leahy (born 1956), former CEO of British supermarket chain Tesco
Terry Matthews (born 1943), Welsh-born Canadian entrepreneur
Terry Pratchett (1948–2015), English novelist
Terry Wogan (1938–2016), Irish broadcaster who received an honorary Knighthood in the 2005 Queen's Birthday Honours List